Rhopalophora prolixa is a species of beetle in the family Cerambycidae. It was described by Monné in 1989.

References

prolixa
Beetles described in 1989